The Traralgon International (formerly known as Traralgon Challenger) is a professional tennis tournament played on outdoor hard courts. It is part of the ATP Challenger Tour and the International Tennis Federation (ITF) Women's World Tennis Tour. It is held annually in Traralgon, Victoria, Australia, since 2006.

From 2006 to 2012, the tournament was held as an ITF women's event. From 2013 to 2019 the tournament was held as an ATP Challenger event. In 2022, the tournament will hold both women's and men's events.

The 2014 Traralgon hosted two challenger events, back to back from October 27 to November 9.

Past finals

Men's singles

Women's singles

Men's doubles

Women's doubles

References

External links
 Official website

 
ATP Challenger Tour
ITF Women's World Tennis Tour
Challenger tennis tournaments
Hard court tennis tournaments
Traralgon
Tennis tournaments in Australia